This is a list of cultural properties in Lingayen, a municipality in the province of Pangasinan on the island of Luzon in the Philippines.

|}

References

Lingayen
Buildings and structures in Pangasinan